, or , is a Japanese national university in Sapporo, Hokkaido. It was the fifth Imperial University in Japan, which were established to be the nation's finest institutions of higher education or research. Hokkaido University is considered one of the top universities in Japan and was ranked 5th in THE Japan University Rankings. It was also selected as a "Top Type" university by the Japanese government's Top Global University Project. The main campus is located in downtown Sapporo, just north of Sapporo Station, and stretches approximately 2.4 kilometers northward.

History
The history of the university dates to the formal incorporation of Yezo as Hokkaido into the Japanese realm. Director of the Hokkaidō Development Commission Kuroda Kiyotaka, having traveled to America in 1870, looked to the American model of settling the new lands. Upon return he brought General Horace Capron, a commissioner of agriculture who pushed for the adoption of new agricultural practices and crops in Hokkaido's colder clime. In September 1907,  set up the faculty of Agriculture in Sapporo. It was one of nine Imperial Universities. The School of Medicine was established in 1919, at which time the Agricultural College became the Faculty of Agriculture. This was followed by the Faculty of Engineering, the Faculty of Science, and finally in 1947, the Faculty of Law and Literature. The current name of Hokkaido University also came into use in 1947. In 1953, the Graduate School was established.

Since 2004 the university has been incorporated as a National University Corporation under a new law which applies to all national universities. Although the incorporation has led to increased financial independence and autonomy, Hokkaido University is still partially controlled by the Japanese Ministry of Education.

In 2014 the university was selected under the Super Global Universities program that began as an initiative of Prime Minister Shinzō Abe who stated its aim was to help more of Japan's universities rank in the top 100 worldwide. Under the program, it is listed in the top university category or Type A—(Top Type) The Top Type is for world-class universities that have the potential to be ranked in the top 100 in world university rankings. Each Type A university will receive ¥420 million ($US 4.2 million) annually until 2023.

In June 2020, Hokkaido University president Toyoharu Nawa was dismissed by Japanese education minister Koichi Hagiuda for abuse of power at the workplace, becoming the first national university president to be dismissed since national universities became independent in 2004. He was succeeded by former neurosurgeon and director of Hokkaido University Hospital Kiyohiro Houkin.

Faculties and graduate schools

Faculties

Graduate schools

Postgraduate degree programs in English
The following departments offer postgraduate degrees taught entirely in English

 Agriculture 
 Chemical Sciences and Engineering  
 Engineering 
 Environmental Science 
 Life Sciences 
 Science 
 Veterinary Medicine

Both international and domestic students may apply for graduate programs taught in English. Competitive scholarships are available for all graduate and undergraduate students enrolled in English degree programs, which range in amount from tuition discounts to full funding.

Special degree programs for international students 
The university offers two programs aimed exclusively at international students: One, four-year undergraduate degree program, the Modern Japanese Studies Program (MJSP), and one, five-year degree program comprising both undergraduate- and graduate-level study, the Integrated Science Program (ISP). As with other English-based degree programs at the university, competitive scholarships are available for all graduate and undergraduate students, which range in amount from tuition discounts to full funding.

Modern Japanese Studies Program (MJSP) 
The Modern Japanese Studies Program is a bilingual, bachelor's degree program that aims to educate students about the history, culture, society, and political economy of modern Japan while raising them to fluency in the Japanese language. The program offers two majors, one in History and Culture and one in Society and Political Economy. The majors share coursework, so whichever of the previous specializations a student does not choose as their major becomes their minor.

Integrated Science Program (ISP) 
The Integrated Science Program is a multifaceted degree program that aims to provide students with a bachelor's degree in either biology, chemistry, or physics followed by their immediate enrollment in one of Hokkaido University's graduate schools. Through the unique, accelerated methodology of the program, students are able to graduate with a master's degree in five years (made up of three-and-a-half years of undergraduate study and one-and-a-half years of graduate study and research). It also aims to strengthen students' knowledge of English due to its importance as a scientific language.

Institutes
The university's Institute of Seismology and Volcanology was founded in 1998 in collaboration with several seismological observatories around Hokkaido. The institute is represented on the national Coordinating Committee for Earthquake Prediction.

In 2016, the university launched the Hokkaido Summer Institute, a three-month-long program from June to August which offers a variety of classes for both undergraduate and graduate students. Guest lecturers are invited from all over the world to share their expertise for the courses, which usually run for 1–2 weeks and grant students a small amount of academic credit. Both Japanese and foreign students participate in this unique program, which is conducted entirely in English.

Campus

Sapporo campus

The main Sapporo campus is located just north of Sapporo Station, in the heart of Sapporo City. The entirety of the campus measures approximately 180 hectares and houses academic and administrative buildings, research laboratories, student dormitories, and farmland. The main academic buildings are found along a 1.5 kilometer stretch of road that runs from the Main Gate to the Kita 18 Gate, roughly encompassing the distance between Kita-Juni-Jo and Kita 18-jo subway stations on the Namboku Subway Line. A campus-wide bus service runs regular routes between the southern and northern end of the university, although access is restricted to university staff only.

The abundance of accessible green space has continued to be popular not only among students, but also the general public, who can often be seen using the campus area in a similar way to a public park. Walking tours of the campus for interested foreign and domestic tourists are provided by several businesses in Sapporo, although no tour is needed to visit the campus. Fall is an especially popular time for campus visits, with tourists and Sapporo residents flocking to get a view of the golden ginkgo trees that line Ginkgo Avenue.

Hakodate campus
The campus is located in Hakodate, a city located in the southern part of Hokkaidō. The Faculty and Graduate School of Fisheries Science are located there. However, students of Fisheries Science start their education at the Sapporo campus in order to complete three semesters of compulsory liberal arts education courses and move to the Hakodate campus from the second semester of their sophomore year. As the minimum requirement to study at the Hakodate campus is only one year of a four-year bachelor's program, the turn-over rate of students entering and leaving the Hakodate campus is fairly high. To provide students in the Faculty and Graduate School of Fisheries Science with practical hands-on experience, the university has two fully operational research vessels, the Oshoru Maru and the Ushio Maru, based in nearby Hakodate harbor. Graduate students and professors also use these vessels to carry out their research.

Overseas satellite offices
In order to raise awareness of the university internationally, as of June 2018 Hokkaido University was operating eight satellite offices worldwide. After opening its first overseas satellite office in Seoul, South Korea, Hokkaido University has also established satellite offices in Helsinki (Finland), Beijing (China), Lusaka (Zambia), Bandung (Indonesia), Quezon City (Philippines), Kamphaeng Saen (Thailand), and a special China Office in Beijing. Interested parties can not only obtain information regarding the university at these offices, but prospective students can also take university entrance exams there, a procedure which previously was only offered in Japan.

Educational philosophy

Academic rankings

General rankings
In 2017, the CWTS Leiden Ranking ranked them at 120th in the world and 6th in Japan. In 2018, QS World University Rankings ranked Hokkaido University at 122nd in the world (7th in Japan).

In 2019, the Times Higher Education(THE) Japan ranked them 5th in Japan. Also in that year, they ranked as 6th or 7th in Japan according to the Academic Ranking of World Universities (ARWU), and between 151st and 200th in the world.

In 2013, their highest score in QS Ranking was for Faculty Student Score (88 out of 100).  Their lowest was for International Faculty Score (13.5 out of 100). In an effort to boost their International Faculty Score, Hokkaido has recently been selected to be part of Japan's Super Global Universities Program.  This program provides special funding to hire international faculty.

Research performance
According to Thomson Reuters, Hokkaido is the 6th best research university in Japan. Its research standard is especially high in Materials Science (7th in Japan, 86th in the world), Chemistry (8th in Japan, 52nd in the world), and Biology & Biochemistry (6th in Japan, 104th in the world).

Weekly Diamond reported that Hokkaido has the 10th highest research standard in Japan in terms of research funding per researchers in the COE Program.

According to the QS World university rankings in September 2012, Hokkaido University was placed 135th (worldwide) and 6th (in Japan) for general standards in engineering and technology.

It also has a good research standard in Economics, as RePec ranked Hokkaido as the 16th best Economics research university in Jan 2011.

The Nobel Prize
As of 2021, two alumni and faculty members have won the Nobel Prize in Chemistry. The university received attention in 2010 when Professor Akira Suzuki won the Nobel Prize for Chemistry jointly with Richard F. Heck and Ei-ichi Negishi. Benjamin List, winner of the 2021 Nobel Prize in Chemistry, is the principal investigator at the Institute for Chemical Reaction Design and Discovery of the Hokkaido University. Also, Ei-ichi Negishi, special invited professor at the Institute for Catalysis (ICAT) of the Hokkaido University, was awarded the Nobel Prize in Chemistry as well.

In addition, the Hokkaido Imperial University alumni Kōichi Ichikawa (市川 厚一) completed the first artificial induction of cancer in history in 1915 and discovered the cause of cancer, but in 1926 the Nobel Prize in Physiology or Medicine was awarded to Johannes Fibiger. A few years later, everyone discovered that Fibiger's research was completely wrong. Until the middle of the 20th century, Japanese scientists missed the Nobel Prize many times because of racial discrimination.

Alumni rankings

Graduate school rankings
Hokkaido Law School was ranked 6th in 2010 (8th in 2009) in the passing rate of Japanese Bar Examination.

Eduniversal ranked Hokkaido as 2nd in the rankings of "Excellent Business Schools nationally strong and/or with continental links " in Japan.

Popularity and selectivity
Hokkaido is one of the most selective universities in Japan. Its entrance difficulty is usually considered one of the top in Japan.

Notable alumni

Uchimura Kanzō, Christian evangelist, founder of Non-church Christianity Movement
Akira Ifukube, composer
Nitobe Inazō, the author of Bushido: the Soul of Japan, a Quaker
Ryuzo Yanagimachi, assisted fertilization and cloning pioneer
Mamoru Mohri, astronaut
Takeo Arishima, novelist
Riko Muranaka, medical doctor and journalist
Hiroshi Ishii, computer scientist
Junko Ohashi, pop singer
Akira Suzuki, Nobel Prize in Chemistry (2010)
Yuichiro Miura, alpinist, the oldest person to reach the summit of Mount Everest
Juhn Atsushi Wada, neurologist, described the Wada test
Ken-Ichi Honma, chronobiologist, awarded the SRBR award.

Points of interest
Hokkaido University Botanical Gardens

Notes

References
 Nussbaum, Louis-Frédéric and Käthe Roth. (2005).  Japan encyclopedia. Cambridge: Harvard University Press. ;  OCLC 58053128

External links

Hokkaido University, official website
Hokkaido University Library
Hokkaido University International Students Association (HUISA)
Hokkaido University (March, 2005) Handbook for International Students
Sapporo

 
Educational institutions established in 1918
Japanese national universities
National Seven Universities
Universities and colleges in Sapporo
Super Global Universities
Hokkaido American Football Association
1918 establishments in Japan